The 2021–22 Calgary Flames season was the Flames' 42nd season in Calgary, and the 50th season for the Flames' National Hockey League franchise that was established on June 6, 1972. On April 16, 2022, the Flames clinched a playoff berth after the Edmonton Oilers defeated the Vegas Golden Knights. On April 21, the Flames clinched the Pacific Division after a 4–2 victory over the Dallas Stars.

The Flames beat the Stars in seven games in the First Round of the playoffs. But they were defeated in the Second Round by the Edmonton Oilers, in five games.

Standings

Divisional standings

Wild Card standings

Schedule and results

Preseason

Regular season

Playoffs

Player statistics

Skaters

Goaltenders

†Denotes player spent time with another team before joining the Flames. Stats reflect time with the Flames only.
‡Denotes player was traded mid-season. Stats reflect time with the Flames only.
Bold/italics denotes franchise record.

Transactions
The Flames have been involved in the following transactions during the 2021–22 season.

Trades

Players acquired

Players lost

Signings

Draft picks

Below are the Calgary Flames' selections at the 2021 NHL Entry Draft, which were held on July 23 to 24, 2021. It was held virtually via Video conference call from the NHL Network studio in Secaucus, New Jersey.

References

Calgary Flames seasons
Flames
Flames